The 2013–14 NIFL Premiership (known as the Danske Bank Premiership for sponsorship reasons) was the sixth season of Northern Ireland's national football league in this format since its inception in 2008, the 113th season of Irish league football overall, and the first season of the league operating as part of the newly-created Northern Ireland Football League. The season began on 10 August 2013 and concluded on 26 April 2014.

During the sixth round of fixtures, which were played on 7 September 2013, Portadown defeated Ballinamallard United 11–0 at Shamrock Park. This equalled the post-war record for the biggest win in the top-flight, which was set 47 years earlier in the 1966–67 season when Distillery defeated Bangor by the same scoreline in November 1966. In their first season back in the top flight since 2005–06, Ards finished bottom of the table. This was confirmed on 12 April 2014, after Warrenpoint Town defeated Dungannon Swifts 4–0 to leave Ards 10 points adrift in 12th place with only three fixtures remaining. Their relegation was confirmed on the final day of the season, when Institute won the 2013–14 NIFL Championship 1 title.

Cliftonville were the defending champions after winning their fourth league title last season – their first since the 1997–98 season. They went on to retain the title for the first time in the club's history - their fourth outright league title and fifth overall. They were entered into the second qualifying round of the 2014–15 UEFA Champions League, with the league runners-up Linfield, 3rd-placed Crusaders, and the 2013–14 Irish Cup winners, Glenavon, entered into the first qualifying round of the 2014–15 UEFA Europa League.

Teams
After successfully gaining the required Championship Club Licence from the IFA, 2012–13 Championship 1 winners Ards were promoted to this season's Premiership. The club returned to the top flight for the first time since they were relegated in the 2005–06 season. After 11 years in the top flight, last season's bottom-placed Premiership club Lisburn Distillery were relegated to intermediate football for the first time in their history, bringing to an end their record of being one of only four clubs to have retained membership of the senior Irish League since its inception in 1890.

The runners-up of Championship 1, Warrenpoint Town, faced last season's 11th-placed club Donegal Celtic in the promotion/relegation play-off to decide which club would take the final place in this season's Premiership. The tie ended 2–2 on aggregate, with Warrenpoint Town winning on the away goals rule to secure promotion to the top flight of national football for the first time in their history – the club's third promotion in four years.

Stadia and locations

Ground-sharing
Ards nominated Bangor's home ground, Clandeboye Park, as the venue for their home games as they had been without a home ground since 2002. However, as a result of construction work being carried out to the ground, their first four home matches of the season were played at Dixon Park – the home of Championship side Ballyclare Comrades. The other newly promoted side, Warrenpoint Town, played some of their home fixtures at Dungannon Swifts' ground, Stangmore Park. This was due to improvements being carried out at their own ground, Milltown, in order to upgrade it to Premiership standard. However, the first ever Premiership game to be played at the ground, which was against Glenavon, was abandoned during half-time due to floodlight failure. The first completed fixture at the ground was a 2–0 win over Ards on 26 December 2013. That match also experienced floodlight problems, delaying kick-off for the second half by 20 minutes.

League table

Results

Matches 1–22
During matches 1–22 each team played every other team twice (home and away).

Matches 23–33
During matches 23–33 each team played every other team for the third time (either at home, or away).

Matches 34–38
During matches 34–38 each team played every other team in their half of the table once. As this was the fourth time that teams had played each other this season, home sides were chosen so that they had played each other twice at home and twice away.

Section A

Section B

Top scorers

† Darren Boyce scored 12 goals for Dungannon Swifts while on loan from parent club Coleraine, before transferring to Ballymena United in January 2014.

Promotion/relegation play-off
The play-off did not take place this season because Bangor, runners-up of the 2013–14 NIFL Championship 1, did not possess a licence to participate in top-flight football.

NIFL Premiership clubs in Europe 2013–14

UEFA coefficient and ranking
For the 2013–14 UEFA competitions, the associations were allocated places according to their 2012 UEFA country coefficients, which took into account their performance in European competitions from 2007–08 to 2011–12. In the 2012 rankings used for this season's European competitions, Northern Ireland's coefficient points total was 2.583. After earning a score of 0.500 during the 2011–12 European campaign, the league was ranked by UEFA as the 48th best league in Europe out of 53 - up one place from 49th the previous season. This season Northern Ireland earned 0.875 points, which was added to the points total for the 2014 rankings used in 2015–16 UEFA competitions.

 46  Wales 2.749
 47  Estonia 2.666
 48  Northern Ireland 2.583
 49  Luxembourg 2.333
 50  Armenia 2.208
 Full list

UEFA Champions League

After winning the league last season, Cliftonville were the sole representatives in the 2013–14 UEFA Champions League. They entered the draw in the second qualifying round. The draw to discover their opponents took place on 24 June 2013, and Cliftonville were rewarded with a dream tie against Scottish giants, Celtic. The first leg took place at Solitude on 17 July 2013, and Celtic earned a comfortable 3–0 win. The second leg was played at Celtic Park on 23 July 2013, with Celtic winning 2–0 for a comfortable 5–0 aggregate victory.

Second Qualifying round

First leg

Second leg

Celtic won 5–0 on aggregate.

UEFA Europa League

2012–13 League runners-up Crusaders, third-placed Linfield, and Irish Cup winners Glentoran all earned a place in the UEFA Europa League. They entered the draw at the first qualifying round. The draw to discover their opponents took place on 24 June 2013. Glentoran were paired against KR of Iceland while Linfield faced ÍF Fuglafjørður from the Faroe Islands. For the second consecutive season, Crusaders were drawn to play Rosenborg of Norway, the team they lost 4–0 on aggregate to at the same stage of last season's competition. Crusaders played the first leg at home on 4 July 2013 and went down 2–1 to Rosenborg, having led the match 1–0. In the second leg, Crusaders were well beaten 7–2 away from home, crashing out of the competition 9–3 on aggregate. Glentoran were away from home for the first leg and came away with a respectable 0–0 draw, however in the second leg at home they were disappointingly defeated 3–0 and exited the competition 3–0 on aggregate.

Linfield played their first leg in the Faroe Islands on 3 July 2013, and came away with a 2–0 victory. This was the club's first European away win in 47 years, since a 4–1 victory away to Vålerenga in the second round of the 1966–67 European Cup. In the second leg, Linfield won 3–0 to go through to the next round 5–0 on aggregate - the first time in the club's history that they had won both legs of a European tie. After the exit of both Crusaders and Glentoran from the competition, this left Linfield as the league's only representative in the second qualifying round. They faced Greek side Xanthi in the next round. Despite being massive underdogs for the tie, a 1–0 victory in the away leg made it three consecutive victories for Linfield in Europe, without conceding a goal in the process - another first for the club. However, in the second leg at home they went down 2–1 after extra time, which eliminated them on the away goals rule.

First Qualifying round

First legs

Second legs

Linfield won 5–0 on aggregate.

Rosenborg won 9–3 on aggregate.

KR won 3–0 on aggregate.

Second Qualifying round

First leg

Second leg

2–2 on aggregate. Skoda Xanthi won on away goals rule.

References

2013-14
North
1